Heikki Paasonen may refer to:

* Heikki Paasonen (linguist) (1865–1919), Finnish linguist 
 Heikki Paasonen (presenter) (born 1983), Finnish television presenter